Judith Bailey may refer to:

 Judith Bailey (academic) (born 1946), American academic who presided both the Western and Northern Michigan universities
 Judith Bailey (composer) (born 1941), English composer, conductor and Cornish Bard
 Judith Jones (née Bailey, 1924–2017), American writer and editor known for rescuing The Diary of Anne Frank from a rejection pile
 Judy Bailey (pianist) (born Judith Mary Bailey in 1935), New Zealand-born pianist and jazz musician
 Judith Bailey Perkins, American professor and daughter of politician John Moran Bailey
 Rita May (actress) (born 1942), who played a character named Judith Bailey in a 2005 episode of British medical drama series Bodies

See also
 Bailey (surname)